'Iceman' John Scully (born July 28, 1967) is a former American boxer. Formerly a world-ranked professional light heavyweight, he is now a boxing trainer who has trained two light heavyweight champions in Chad Dawson and Artur Beterbiev and is an analyst for the ESPN Classic television network. John is also known for his work with disadvantaged former fighters and charity for them as well as organizing events targeting former amateur standout fighters and reconnecting them with the boxing community.

Amateur career
Scully graduated from Windsor (Connecticut) High School in 1985. He began boxing in 1982 and won numerous championships at middleweight, including the 1987 Ohio State Fair (Columbus, Ohio), the 1987 National PAL (Jacksonville, Florida) and the 1988 Eastern U.S. Olympic Trials (Fayetteville, North Carolina).

Scully defeated World  Amateur Champion Darin Allen to win the Eastern Trials, future heavyweight contender Melvin Foster to win the Ohio Fair, and nationally rated Kertis Mingo at the National PAL.

Scully won Outstanding Boxer awards at both the 1987 Western Massachusetts Golden Gloves and the 1988 Eastern U.S. Olympic Trials tournaments.

In February 1988, the  boxer was named to the All-Time team (in the middleweight spot), for the WM Golden Gloves in Holyoke, Massachusetts, joining fellow standouts Mike Tyson (heavyweight) and Marlon "Magic Man" Starling (honorable mention at welterweight). Scully won four straight WM Golden Gloves titles (1985–1988) and three consecutive New England Golden Gloves titles (1986–1988).

He defeated fellow future world-title challenger Joey DeGrandis to win the 1988 New England Golden Gloves championships.

Scully also advanced to the championship round of the National Golden Gloves tournament on two occasions, losing on a 3–2 split decision in 1987 at Knoxville (to Fabian Williams of Michigan) and a highly disputed 3–2 call in Omaha in 1988, to Keith Providence of New York City.

Scully also notably scored two decision victories en route to each of those national final appearances in 1987 and 1988 over hard-punching future WBC #1 Middleweight contender Lamar "Kidfire" Parks of Greenville, South Carolina.

The "Iceman" concluded his amateur career with a Bronze medal winning performance at the 1988 U.S. Olympic Trials in Concord, California, defeating # 3 ranked Joe Hill of Omaha in the quarter-finals before losing a 4–1 decision to World Champion Darin Allen of Columbus, Ohio in the semi-final rematch of their Eastern U.S. Olympic Trials final just one month earlier.

Scully turned professional with a final amateur record of 57–13 (not including two junior olympic bouts at age 15 and two exhibition matches).

Professional career
Scully turned professional in 1988 and finished his career in 2001 with a 38–11 record (21 knockouts). He fought for the International Boxing Federation world light heavyweight championship at Leipzig, Germany in 1996, losing a 12-round decision to unbeaten champion Henry Maske. On December 8, 1995, Scully fought two-time world champion Michael Nunn for the WBO NABO super middleweight title. Although ESPN commentators had the fight close, Nunn was awarded a unanimous win, including a curiously wide score on the card of judge Harold Gomes.

His victories include a unanimous ten-round decision over Art Baylis (On Prime TV Network), a ten-round decision over WBC International  champion Billy Bridges at Harrah's in Atlantic City (on ESPN) and a second-round stoppage over former IBO  world champion Willie Ball at Foxwoods Resort and Casino in Connecticut.

Scully also captured a November 1989 unanimous decision on USA's Tuesday Night Fights, over the former #1 nationally ranked  amateur Alphonso Bailey of Kentucky. Scully-Bailey was the co-feature to Simon Brown's IBF  title defense against Luis Santana.

On May 22, 1992 at Agawam, Massachusetts Scully captured a unanimous 12-round decision over Southern Boxing Association champion Melvin Wynn of Atlanta, Georgia in a fight contested for the World Boxing Federation Intercontinental Super Middleweight title.

Scully also frequently served as a sparring partner for some of the biggest names in the sport, including the highly regarded world champions Henry Maske, Mike McCallum, Vinny Pazienza, Roy Jones Jr. and James "Lights Out" Toney.

In November 2010, "Iceman" John Scully was inducted into the fifth class of the Connecticut Boxing Hall of Fame at the Mohegan Sun Resort and Casino in Connecticut.

Professional boxing record

|-
|align="center" colspan=8|38 Wins (21 knockouts, 17 decisions), 11 Losses (1 weight drained technical knockout, 10 decisions)
|-
| align="center" style="border-style: none none solid solid; background: #e3e3e3"|Result
| align="center" style="border-style: none none solid solid; background: #e3e3e3"|Record
| align="center" style="border-style: none none solid solid; background: #e3e3e3"|Opponent
| align="center" style="border-style: none none solid solid; background: #e3e3e3"|Type
| align="center" style="border-style: none none solid solid; background: #e3e3e3"|Round
| align="center" style="border-style: none none solid solid; background: #e3e3e3"|Date
| align="center" style="border-style: none none solid solid; background: #e3e3e3"|Location
| align="center" style="border-style: none none solid solid; background: #e3e3e3"|Notes
|-align=center
|Win
|
|align=left| Cleveland Nelson
|SD
|8
|22/06/2001
|align=left| Mississauga, Ontario, Canada
|align=left| Scully puts on a superb display of boxing and punching, featuring an accurate left jab.
|-
|Loss
|
|align=left| Ernest Mateen
|UD
|8
|19/04/2001
|align=left| New Haven, Connecticut, U.S.
|align=left|
|-
|Loss
|
|align=left| Sam Ahmad
|MD
|8
|04/06/1999
|align=left| Philadelphia, Pennsylvania, U.S.
|align=left|
|-
|Loss
|
|align=left| Drake Thadzi
|TKO
|7
|02/08/1998
|align=left| Boston, Massachusetts, U.S.
|align=left|
|-
|Win
|
|align=left| Scott Lopeck
|TKO
|6
|18/12/1997
|align=left| Hartford, Connecticut, U.S.
|align=left|
|-
|Loss
|
|align=left| Ernest Mateen
|UD
|10
|29/06/1997
|align=left| Hartford, Connecticut, U.S.
|align=left|
|-
|Loss
|
|align=left| Graciano Rocchigiani
|UD
|10
|22/03/1997
|align=left| Prenzlauer Berg, Berlin, Germany
|align=left|
|-
|Loss
|
|align=left| Henry Maske
|UD
|12
|25/05/1996
|align=left| Leipzig, Germany
|align=left|
|-
|Win
|
|align=left| Jose Luis Feliciano
|TKO
|1
|15/03/1996
|align=left| Revere, Massachusetts, U.S.
|align=left|
|-
|Loss
|
|align=left| Michael Nunn
|UD
|12
|08/12/1995
|align=left| Mashantucket, Connecticut, U.S.
|align=left|
|-
|Win
|
|align=left| Willie Ball
|TKO
|2
|20/09/1995
|align=left| Mashantucket, Connecticut, U.S.
|align=left|
|-
|Win
|
|align=left| Willie Kemp
|PTS
|8
|17/05/1995
|align=left| Mashantucket, Connecticut], U.S.
|align=left|
|-
|Win
|
|align=left| Luis Oliveira
|TKO
|1
|14/03/1995
|align=left| Boston, Massachusetts, U.S.
|align=left|
|-
|Win
|
|align=left| Art Bayliss
|PTS
|10
|20/10/1994
|align=left| Mashantucket, Connecticut, U.S.
|align=left|
|-
|Win
|
|align=left| Tim Cooper
|PTS
|8
|18/08/1994
|align=left| Mashantucket, Connecticut, U.S.
|align=left|
|-
|Win
|
|align=left| Willie Kemp
|PTS
|8
|25/06/1994
|align=left| Revere, Massachusetts, U.S.
|align=left|
|-
|Win
|
|align=left| David McCluskey
|TKO
|4
|12/03/1994
|align=left| Hartford, Connecticut, U.S.
|align=left|
|-
|Win
|
|align=left| Jose Vera
|TKO
|4
|06/11/1993
|align=left| Foxborough, Massachusetts, U.S.
|align=left|
|-
|Loss
|
|align=left| Tony Thornton
|UD
|10
|16/03/1993
|align=left| Philadelphia, Pennsylvania, U.S.
|align=left|
|-
|Loss
|
|align=left| Tim Littles
|UD
|12
|13/11/1992
|align=left| Las Vegas, Nevada, U.S.
|align=left|
|-
|Win
|
|align=left| Jose Vera
|PTS
|6
|24/09/1992
|align=left| Randolph, Massachusetts, U.S.
|align=left|
|-
|Win
|
|align=left| Herman Farrar
|TKO
|6
|20/08/1992
|align=left| Milford, Connecticut, U.S.
|align=left|
|-
|Win
|
|align=left| Danny Chapman
|TKO
|3
|06/08/1992
|align=left| Hartford, Connecticut, U.S.
|align=left|
|-
|Win
|
|align=left| David McCluskey
|PTS
|6
|30/06/1992
|align=left| Pensacola, Florida, U.S.
|align=left|
|-
|Win
|
|align=left| Melvin Wynn
|UD
|12
|22/05/1992
|align=left| Agawam, Massachusetts, U.S.
|align=left|
|-
|Win
|
|align=left| Jose Vera
|PTS
|6
|27/02/1992
|align=left| Agawam, Massachusetts, U.S.
|align=left|
|-
|Win
|
|align=left| Willie Kemp
|PTS
|10
|22/11/1991
|align=left| Springfield, Massachusetts, U.S.
|align=left|
|-
|Win
|
|align=left| Randy Smith
|PTS
|10
|27/09/1991
|align=left| Springfield, Massachusetts, U.S.
|align=left|
|-
|Win
|
|align=left| Jose Vera
|UD
|8
|23/10/1991
|align=left| Worcester, Massachusetts, U.S.
|align=left|
|-
|Loss
|
|align=left| Kevin Watts
|UD
|10
|18/03/1991
|align=left| Atlantic City, New Jersey, U.S.
|align=left|
|-
|Win
|
|align=left| Billy Bridges
|SD
|10
|12/12/1989
|align=left| Atlantic City, New Jersey, U.S.
|align=left|
|-
|Win
|
|align=left| Alphonso Bailey
|UD
|8
|09/11/1989
|align=left| Springfield, Massachusetts, U.S.
|align=left|
|-
|Win
|
|align=left| Tony Daley
|UD
|10
|29/09/1989
|align=left| Hartford, Connecticut, U.S.
|align=left|
|-
|Win
|
|align=left| Victor King
|TKO
|4
|08/09/1989
|align=left| Taunton, Massachusetts, U.S.
|align=left|
|-
|Win
|
|align=left| Victor King
|UD
|6
|25/08/1989
|align=left| Bridgeport, Connecticut, U.S.
|align=left|
|-
|Loss
|
|align=left| Brett Lally
|UD
|10
|11/07/1989
|align=left| Atlantic City, New Jersey, U.S.
|align=left|
|-
|Win
|
|align=left| Mike Caminiti
|TKO
|6
|16/06/1989
|align=left| Hartford, Connecticut, U.S.
|align=left|
|-
|Win
|
|align=left| Mike "The Heat" Bonislawski
|TKO
|5
|05/05/1989
|align=left| Hartford, Connecticut, U.S.
|align=left|
|-
|Win
|
|align=left| Jerry Fleming
|TKO
|3
|01/05/1989
|align=left| Hartford, Connecticut, U.S.
|align=left|
|-
|Win
|
|align=left| Mike Bonislawski
|PTS
|6
|17/03/1989
|align=left| Hartford, Connecticut, U.S.
|align=left|
|-
|Win
|
|align=left| Bob Saxton
|TKO
|1
|17/02/1989
|align=left| Poughkeepsie, New York, U.S.
|align=left|
|-
|Win
|
|align=left|John Berkins
|KO
|1
|06/01/1989
|align=left| Hartford, Connecticut, U.S.
|align=left|
|-
|Win
|
|align=left| Rahim Muhammad
|TKO
|4
|15/12/1988
|align=left| Rochester, New York, U.S.
|align=left|
|-
|Win
|
|align=left| Vic Ferrer
|TKO
|4
|10/12/1988
|align=left| Salem, New Hampshire, U.S.
|align=left|
|-
|Win
|
|align=left| Jerry Fleming
|TKO
|4
|02/12/1988
|align=left| Poughkeepsie, New York, U.S.
|align=left|
|-
|Win
|
|align=left| Frank Ambrose
|TKO
|4
|25/11/1988
|align=left| Hartford, Connecticut, U.S.
|align=left|
|-
|Win
|
|align=left| John Wilkinson
|TKO
|4
|28/10/1988
|align=left| Hartford, Connecticut, U.S.
|align=left|
|-
|Win
|
|align=left| Steve Jefferson
|TKO
|1
|22/10/1988
|align=left| Salem, New Hampshire, U.S.
|align=left|
|-
|Win
|
|align=left| Paulino Falcone
|TKO
|1
|16/09/1988
|align=left| Hartford, Connecticut, U.S.
|align=left|
|}

Post retirement career
Scully trained several standout amateurs while pursuing his own boxing career, including 1997 National Junior Olympics Champion Sammy Vega, 1995 Ohio State Fair Champion Greg Cuyler, 1998 National PAL Champion Dwayne Hairston and 2000 U.S. Armed Forces Champion Orlando Cordova.

Since 2001, has been successful as a professional trainer, guiding four boxers to world championships (WIBF Lightweight Champion Liz Mueller, WBA Junior Middleweight Champion Jose Antonio Rivera, IBO Super Bantamweight Champion Mike Oliver and WBC Light heavyweight Champion "Bad" Chad Dawson).

The crowning moment may have been when he masterfully guided Rivera to the WBA Junior Middleweight Championship, with a clear points victory on Showtime over defending champion Alejandro "Terra" Garcia.

Scully has also had a hand in the professional training of notable boxers Israel "Pito" Cardona, Matt Godfrey, "Sucra" Ray Olivera, Scott "The Sandman" Pemberton, Lawrence Clay-Bey, Matt Remillard, Francisco "The Wizard" Palacios and George "Monk" Foreman III.

The Iceman also assists in the training camps of former world amateur champion and now IBF light heavyweight world champion Artur Beterbiev, who fights out of Montreal, Canada by way of Chechnya (head trainer is Marc Ramsay).

He is considered an important part of the development of future WBC light heavyweight world champion "Bad" Chad Dawson. Scully first trained Dawson for three successful fights in 2004 and 2005 before unforeseen promotional problems caused Dawson to leave to train in Florida with Dan Birmingham.

Scully and Dawson, however, reunited as a team early in the summer of 2011. Scully later guided Dawson to the biggest win of his professional career on April 28, 2012 at the legendary Boardwalk Hall in Atlantic City, New Jersey. The HBO televised matchup saw Dawson capture a 12-round decision to take the WBC Light heavyweight title from legendary champion Bernard "The Executioner" Hopkins. Notably, when Dawson seemingly began to mentally falter at the halfway point of the match, Scully masterfully kept the challenger steady, focused and on track between rounds. The exceptional cornerwork was properly noted by HBO's ringside broadcast team of Larry Merchant, Emanuel Steward and Jim Lampley.

Known for his insightful takes on the sport of boxing, especially his corner work between rounds of televised fights, Scully has written a highly praised boxing book entitled, "The Iceman Diaries" that details his life within the sport. He appears often on ESPN Classic, working alongside Joe Tessitore, as a ringside analyst for that network's ESPN Classic Boxing Series.

A frequent and widely acclaimed columnist for Britain's "Boxing News" magazine, Scully has also been featured several times on ESPN News, before and after major fights, previewing and analyzing the action, including Pay-Per-View battles between Floyd Mayweather Jr. and Shane Mosley, and Manny Pacquiao and Miguel Cotto.

In 2015 Scully joined the cast of the Nuvo-TV boxing reality show "KNOCKOUT" alongside Roy Jones Jr., Floyd Mayweather Sr. and Sugar Shane Mosley.

Scully was inducted into the Connecticut Boxing Hall of Fame in November 2009 at the Mohegan Sun Casino. He was also inducted into the Billy C. Boxing Hall of Fame (along with Ernie Shavers and Marlon Starling) at South Glens Falls, New York on November 19, 2011.

References

John Scully: New Duke of Hartford Boxing
http://newsroom.mohegansun.com/2009/10/05/scully-heads-up-connecticut-boxing-hall-of-fame-inductees.html
http://www.secondsout.com/features/main-features/interview--iceman-john-scully
http://www.boxingtalk.com/pag/article.php?aid=31296
https://www.youtube.com/watch?v=5OGCyt_82rI&sns=em
广告合作请联系Telegram：@xmm6677
Boxing's Official Record Keeper

External links

1967 births
American color commentators
American male boxers
Boxers from Connecticut
Boxing commentators
Living people
Middleweight boxers